Ruth Davis Kohrt (August 27, 1921 – April 13, 2012) was a regional author from Northwest Iowa.

Biography
She was born into the pioneer family of George and Sadie (Merrill) Davis of Webb, Iowa. George lost the farm in the Depression, but Ruth was able to graduate from both Iowa State Teachers College (now the University of Northern Iowa) and Augustana College. She went on to a 42-year career in Iowa and Minnesota schools, teaching in settings ranging from one-room elementary schools through town high schools. As school librarian and English teacher, she founded five school and town libraries. After she retired, she wrote novels and memoirs. Kohrt's writing is characterized by depictions of the speech, mannerisms and character of people in Northwest Iowa.

She died on April 13, 2012, in Des Moines, Iowa.

Works

Fiction
From a Test Tube with Love (1999) 
Stella’s Statue (2003)

Memoirs
Nine Months at $90 (1997) 
Armon’s Apples (1998) 
Notes from a Depression Girl (2006)

References

1921 births
2012 deaths
20th-century American writers
21st-century American writers
20th-century American women writers
21st-century American women writers
American memoirists
University of Northern Iowa alumni